The Chimantá Massif is a highly fragmented complex of tepuis in Bolívar state, Venezuela. It is divided in two by the Río Tírica, with the northern section being both larger and higher. The massif is notable for its high species richness and for its varied habitat types. The massif is situated entirely within the bounds of Canaima National Park. It hosts extensive cave systems, including the world's largest known quartzite cave, Cueva Charles Brewer, named after discoverer Charles Brewer-Carías. The processes behind their speleogenesis are the subject of some debate.

The isolated southern peaks of Angasima-tepui and Upuigma-tepui are sometimes considered part of the Chimantá Massif.

Tepuis
The major tepuis of the northern and southern parts of the Chimantá Massif are listed below. Coordinates given correspond to the approximate centre points of the tepui summit plateaus. Unless otherwise indicated, all information in the tables is sourced from Flora of the Venezuelan Guayana.

Northern group

An additional plateau, Sarvén-tepui, may be distinguished to the east of Chimantá-tepui.

Southern group

See also
 Chimantaea
 Distribution of Heliamphora
 Heliamphora sp. 'Akopán Tepui'

References

Further reading

 Barrio-Amorós, C.L., J. Mesa, C. Brewer-Carías & R.W. McDiarmid (25 May 2010). A new Pristimantis (Anura, Terrarana, Strabomantidae) from Churi-tepui in the Chimanta Massif, Venezuelan Guayana. Zootaxa 2483: 35–44.
  Delascio-Chitty, F. & C. Brewer–Carías (February 2006). Notas florísticas del Churi–tepuy, Estado Bolívar, Venezuela. [Floristic notes of the Churí-tepuy, State of Bolívar, Venezuela.] In: I Congreso Internacional de Biodiversidad del Escudo Guayanés: Programa y Libro de Resúmenes. Universidad Nacional Experimental de Guayana, Puerto Ordaz. p. 141.
 Derka, T. & P. Fedor (21 October 2010). Hydrolutos breweri sp. n., a new aquatic Lutosini species (Orthoptera: Anostostomatidae) from Churí-tepui (Chimantá Massif, Venezuela). Zootaxa 2653: 51–59.
 Jaffe, K., J. Lattke & R. Perez-Hernández (January–June 1993). Ants on the tepuies of the Guiana Shield: a zoogeographic study. Ecotropicos 6(1): 21–28.
  Huber, O. (ed.) (1992). El Macizo del Chimantá, Escudo de Guayana, Venezuela. Un ensayo ecológico tepuyano. Oscar Todtmann Editores, Caracas. 
 Kodada, J., T. Derka & F. Čiampor, Jr. (6 March 2012). Description of Jolyelmis spangleri a new species from Churí-tepui (Chimantá Massif, Venezuela), with a description of the larva of J. spangleri and J. reitmaieri (Insecta: Coleoptera: Elmidae). Zootaxa 3223: 1–23.
 Kok, P.J.R., R.D. MacCulloch, D.B. Means, K. Roelants, I. Van Bocxlaer & F. Bossuyt (7 August 2012).  Current Biology 22(15): R589–R590.  
  La Cruz, L. (February–April 2010). Iván Calderon y su mundo vertical. Río Verde 1: 98–115.

Tepuis of Venezuela
Mountains of Venezuela
Climbing areas of Venezuela